The tenth legislative assembly election of Tamil Nadu was held on 24 June 1991. The All India Anna Dravida Munnetra Kazhagam (AIADMK) – Indian National Congress (INC) alliance won the elections in a landslide and AIADMK general secretary J. Jayalalithaa became the chief minister. This was her first term in office. The united strength of AIADMK (after the merger of Jayalalithaa and Janaki Ramachandran and R M Veerappan faction, who was made Joint General Secretary of AIADMK]), the alliance with the Congress, and the wave of public sympathy in the wake of Rajiv Gandhi assassination combined to produce a massive victory for the AIADMK. The DMK could only win 2 seats. This was the worst performance of the DMK since it entered electoral politics in the 1957.

Background

President's rule
On 30 January 1991, the DMK government which had come to power after winning the 1989 assembly election, was dismissed by the Indian Prime minister Chandra Shekhar using Article 356 of the Indian Constitution. President's rule was imposed on Tamil Nadu from 31 January. The reason cited for the dismissal was the deterioration of law and order in the state. The dismissal followed pressure on the Chandra Shekhar government by the Congress and AIADMK to dismiss the DMK government. The Chandra Shekhar government fell in March 1991 after the Congress withdrew its outside support. Fresh elections for both the Indian parliament and Tamil Nadu Legislative Assembly were scheduled for June 1991.

Unification of AIADMK
The AIADMK which had contested and lost the 1989 elections as two different factions reunited under the leadership of Jayalalithaa in February 1989. The V. N. Janaki Ramachandran faction merged with the Jayalalithaa faction to form a single united party and Janaki retired from politics. The reunited party regained the popular "Two Leaves" symbol of the AIADMK. (The Election Commission of India had frozen the symbol for the 1989 elections due to the split). The united AIADMK was able to prove its strength immediately by winning the elections held for two constituencies -Marungapuri and Madurai East on 11 March 1989. (for these two constituencies elections had been postponed earlier due to technical reasons).The AIADMK then allied with the Congress for the 1989 Parliamentary elections. The AIADMK-Congress alliance won 38 of the 39 Lok Sabha seats in that election routing the DMK-Janata Dal led National Front.

Formation of PMK
The 1991 elections was the first state elections contested by the Pattali Makkal Katchi (PMK), S. Ramadoss, the leader of the Vanniyar caste organisation which demanded proportional reservation in education and employment based on population ratio of each community – the Vanniyar Sangam converted into a political party and entered electoral politics with the 1989 parliamentary elections. The emergence of PMK cut into the DMK's political base in the northern districts of Tamil Nadu.

Formation of TMK
In 1991, the Thayaga Marumalarchi Kazhagam (TMK) was formed by the actor-politician Vijaya T. Rajendar after he split from the DMK. Later, some of the second rung leaders of the ADMK including Su. Thirunavukkarasar, K. K. S. S. R. Ramachandran, S. D. Ugamchand, V. Karuppasamy Pandian split from the party. For the 1991 elections they formed a pact with T. Rajendar and contested as TMK candidates.

Assassination of Rajiv Gandhi

On 21 May 1991, leader of the Indian National Congress and its prime ministerial candidate for the 1991 general elections was assassinated by a LTTE suicide bomber. The assassination took place at a campaign meeting at Sriperumpudur where he was campaigning for the Congress candidate Maragatham Chandrasekar.

Coalitions
The two main political formations in this election were the DMK and AIADMK led fronts. The DMK coalition comprised the Communist Party of India (CPI), Communist Party of India (Marxist) (CPM),  Janata Dal (JD) and Thayaga Marumalarchi Kazhagam (TMK). The AIADMK front had only two major parties – itself and the Congress. The AIADMK also backed the ICS (SCS) candidate Sanjay Ramasamy in the Virudhunagar constituency. Several smaller parties like the PMK contested the elections alone.

Seat allotments

AIADMK Front

DMK Front

Voting and results
The polling for the state assembly elections were held simultaneously with the polling for the 1991 Parliamentary elections on 24 June 1991. The voter turnout was 63.92%.

Results by Pre-Poll Alliance

|-
! style="background-color:#E9E9E9;text-align:left;vertical-align:top;" |Alliance/Party
!style="width:4px" |
! style="background-color:#E9E9E9;text-align:right;" |Seats won
! style="background-color:#E9E9E9;text-align:right;" |Change
! style="background-color:#E9E9E9;text-align:right;" |Popular Vote
! style="background-color:#E9E9E9;text-align:right;" |Vote %
! style="background-color:#E9E9E9;text-align:right;" |Adj. %‡
|-
! style="background-color:#009900; color:white"|AIADMK+ alliance
! style="background-color: " | 
| 225
| +172
| 14,738,042
| colspan=2 style="text-align:center;vertical-align:middle;"| 59.8%
|-
|AIADMK
! style="background-color: #008000" |
| 164
| +137
| 10,940,966
| 44.4%
| 61.1%
|-
|INC
! style="background-color: #00FFFF" |
| 60
| +34
| 3,743,859
| 15.2%
| 56.2%
|-
|ICS(SCS)†
! style="background-color: #800000" |
| 1
| +1
| 53,217
| 0.2%
| 56.1%
|-
! style="background-color:#FF0000; color:white"|DMK+ alliance
! style="background-color: " |
| 7
| -164
| 7,405,935
| colspan=2 style="text-align:center;vertical-align:middle;"| 30.0%
|-
|DMK
! style="background-color: #FF0000" |
| 2
| -148
| 5,535,668
| 22.5%
| 29.9%
|-
|TMK
! style="background-color: #FF00FF" |
| 2
| -1
| 371,645
| 1.5%
| 31.0%
|-
|CPI(M)
! style="background-color: #000080" |
| 1
| -14
| 777,532
| 3.2%
| 31.2%
|-
|JD
! style="background-color: #FFFF00" |
| 1
| +1
| 415,947
| 1.7%
| 28.3%
|-
|CPI
! style="background-color: #0000FF" |
| 1
| -2
| 305,143
| 1.2%
| 29.9%
|-
! style="background-color:gray; color:white"|Others
! style="background-color:gray" |
| 2
| -8
| 2,505,431
| colspan=2 style="text-align:center;vertical-align:middle;"| 10.2%
|-
|PMK
! style="background-color: #800080" |
| 1
| +1
| 1,452,982
| 5.9%
| 7.0%
|-
|JP
! style="background-color: " |
| 0
| -4
| 51,564
| 0.2%
| 0.7%
|-
|IND
! style="background-color: #666666" |
| 1
| -5
| 390,227
| 1.6%
| 1.7%
|-
| style="text-align:center;" |Total
! style="background-color: " |
| 234
| –
| 24,649,408
| 100%
| style="text-align:center;" | –
|-
|}
†: ICS(SCS) contested in 13 different constituencies, but only the one contested by Sanjay Ramaswamy was endorsed by AIADMK.‡: Vote % reflects the percentage of votes the party received compared to the entire electorate that voted in this election. Adjusted (Adj.) Vote %, reflects the % of votes the party received per constituency that they contested.
Sources: Election Commission of India

Constituency wise results

Analysis
The AIADMK coalition won a massive victory in this election capturing 225 of 234 seats. The DMK coalition was routed with only 7 victories. DMK itself could win only 2 seats including that of its leader M. Karunanidhi. Though Karunanidhi won from the Harbour constituency, he resigned his seat immediately. The victory of AIADMK-Congress has been attributed mainly to the sympathy wave following the Rajiv Gandhi assassination. Other factors which helped their victory were the consolidation of the AIADMK votes under the unified AIADMK party, successful projection by Jayalalithaa as the true political heir to M. G. Ramachandran (M.G.R), successful portrayal of DMK as anti-woman (by playing up the events in the Assembly on 25 March 1989) and the PMK cutting into the DMK's vote bank in the northern districts. This election saw the first electoral success of the PMK, when its candidate Panruti Ramachandran was elected from the Panruti constituency.

See also
Elections in Tamil Nadu
Legislature of Tamil Nadu
Government of Tamil Nadu

References

External links
 Election Commission of India

State Assembly elections in Tamil Nadu
1990s in Tamil Nadu
Tamil Nadu
June 1991 events in Asia